The Girl in Possession is a 1934 British comedy film starring Laura La Plante and Henry Kendall and directed by Monty Banks, who also wrote the screenplay and featured in the film himself.

The film was a quota quickie production shot at Twickenham Studios, with La Plante as wisecracking New York girl Eve Chandler who receives the good news that she has inherited a large country estate in England.  She crosses the Atlantic with her pal Julie, only to find that things are not as straightforward as she had been led to believe.  Complications ensue as she crosses paths with a silly-ass toff (Claude Hulbert), an unscrupulous continental lothario (Banks) and a snobbish butler (Charles Paton) before she manages to sort matters out with the help of the kindly Sir Mortimer (Kendall), with whom she falls in love.

Cast
 Laura La Plante as Eve Chandler
 Henry Kendall as Sir Mortimer
 Claude Hulbert as Cedric
 Monty Banks as Caruso
 Bernard Nedell as de Courville
 Charles Paton as Saunders
 Millicent Wolf as Julie Garner
 Ernest Seton as Wagstaff

Preservation status
The Girl in Possession is classed by the British Film Institute as a lost film.

When in February 1956, Jack Warner sold the rights to all of his pre-December 1949 films; indlusing (The Girl in Possession) to Associated Artists Productions (which merged with United Artists Television in 1958, and later was subsequently acquired by Turner Broadcasting System in early 1986 as part of a failed takeover of MGM/UA by Ted Turner).

References

External links
 
 The Girl in Possession at BFI Film & TV Database

1934 films
1934 comedy films
British comedy films
Films directed by Monty Banks
British black-and-white films
Lost British films
1934 lost films
Lost comedy films
1930s English-language films
1930s British films